Marc Skinner (born 23 March 1983) is an English professional football coach who is the head coach of Manchester United Women in the FA Women's Super League.

Having been involved with their youth set-up, Skinner went on to manage the Birmingham City Women first team before moving to the United States to manage Orlando Pride in the NWSL. He holds a UEFA A Licence.

Coaching career

Solihull College 
Formerly a teacher, Skinner was football academy manager at Solihull College which opened a ladies-only academy and regional talent hub linked to professional team Birmingham City in 2013.

Birmingham City 
Skinner had held various roles at Birmingham City since 2006 including technical director, reserve team head coach and first-team goalkeeping coach. In December 2016, he was promoted to the position of head coach of the first team. Upon the appointment he said "Since I found out I haven’t stopped smiling, this club is deep in my heart. I am extremely proud to lead this fantastic team and I am hoping to continue the success there already been in the past." The FA WSL was in the middle of a switch to the traditional autumn-to-spring calendar and, as a result, Skinner's first campaign was the shortened 8-game Spring Series from February–May 2017 where Birmingham finished 7th. The team also made the FA Cup final. The Blues improved to a 5th-place finish in the 2017–18 season.

Upon his departure in January 2019, Skinner's Birmingham side sat 4th in the WSL table. He was credited with turning around the Blues’ style of play - creating a well-organized and defensively sound system while implementing a dominant attacking style on a small budget compared to Manchester City, Arsenal and Chelsea who were above them.

Orlando Pride 
On 14 January 2019, Skinner was announced as head coach of Orlando Pride, a team he called "one of the biggest clubs in the world." He became the team's second ever head coach following the departure of Tom Sermanni at the end of 2018. After a difficult start having failed to win any of his opening nine games, Skinner earned his first win as Orlando head coach on 22 June in a 2–1 victory over Sky Blue FC. In his debut campaign, Orlando finished bottom of the league with a franchise record-low 16 points. With the 2020 season disrupted by the COVID-19 pandemic, Orlando Pride saw their schedule reduced to four Fall Series matches. The team failed to win any of them but notably ended the series in dramatic fashion with a second-half comeback from three goals down to tie with North Carolina Courage. After finishing third of five teams in the group stage of the 2021 NWSL Challenge Cup, Orlando picked up 15 points in seven games during an unbeaten start to the regular season, the longest unbeaten start in club history. Combined with the two unbeaten games at the end of the Challenge Cup, the nine game streak matched Orlando's record all-time unbeaten run in all competitions set in October 2017. He stepped down on 23 July 2021, amid reports he had agreed terms with Manchester United.

Manchester United 
On 29 July 2021, Skinner returned to the FA WSL to become the second head coach of Manchester United, taking over from Casey Stoney following her resignation in May 2021. He signed a two-year contract with the option for a third.

Personal life 
Skinner is in a long-term relationship with former England international defender Laura Bassett having met while both coaching for Birmingham's U-14s team. Their daughter, Saede, was born in December 2018.

Managerial statistics 
All competitive games (league and domestic cups) are included.

Honours
Individual
 FA Women's Super League Manager of the Month: December 2021, January 2022, October 2022, December 2022

References 

1983 births
Living people
Orlando Pride coaches
Manchester United W.F.C. managers
National Women's Soccer League coaches
Women's Super League managers
English football managers
Birmingham City W.F.C. managers